The Ship of Souls or Ship of Souls is a 1925 American silent 3-D Western drama film, directed by Charles Miller. It was based on the Western novel The Ship of Souls by Emerson Hough, which was published after his death. It was produced by Max O. Miller, who created the 3-D process used in the film.

Plot
Langley Barnes (Bert Lytell) goes to the North Country after being abandoned by his wife. There he falls in love with Christine Garth (Lillian Rich), and even though he is not legally divorced, marries Christine. Captain Churchill (Cyril Chadwick) is posted to the area to build a radio transmitter, and after returning to the United States, marries Langley's wife, who has now obtained a divorce. After Churchill alerts Barnes with a radio transmission, Langley remarries Christine in a legal ceremony.

Cast

Preservation
With no prints of The Ship of Souls located in any film archives, it is a lost film.

References

External links

 

1925 films
1925 Western (genre) films
American 3D films
1920s 3D films
Films based on American novels
American black-and-white films
Films directed by Charles Miller
Associated Exhibitors films
Silent American Western (genre) films
1920s American films